Philippe Sellier (born 8 November 1931) is a French literary critic and scholar. He is a specialist in the great writers who revolved around Port-Royal-des-Champs: Pascal, Racine, Antoine Arnauld, Louis-Isaac Lemaistre de Sacy, La Rochefoucauld, Mme de Sévigné, Mme de Lafayette.

Main works 
 Port-Royal et la littérature, Paris, Champion publishing house, 2 vol. (1999 and 2000).
 Essais sur l’imaginaire classique, Paris, Champion, 2003.
 Pascal : colorations oratoriennes, in Pascal auteur spirituel, Paris, Champion, 2006.
 Corresponsibility of Dissidents, excentriques et marginaux de l’âge classique. Autour de Cyrano de Bergerac, Mélanges M. Alcover, Paris, Champion, 2006.
 Pascal et la liturgie, Paris, PUF, 1966.
 Pascal et saint Augustin, Paris, Éditions Albin Michel, 1995.
 L'évasion, Paris, Bordas, 1971.
 Le mythe du héros ou le désir d'être Dieu, Paris, Bordas, 1970.
 Édition du Port-Royal by Sainte-Beuve, Paris, Éditions Robert Laffont, “Bouquins”, 2 vol., 2004.
 Édition de Pascal, Paris, Mercure de France, 1976
 Édition de Pascal, Provinciales, Pensées et opuscules divers, in collaboration with G. Ferreyrolles, Paris, La Pochothèque, 2004.
 Corresponsibility of Poétique de la pensée. Mélanges J. Dagen, Paris, Champion, 2007.
 La Bible expliquée à ceux qui ne l'ont pas encore lue, Paris, Éditions du Seuil, 2007.
 Pascal, textes choisis, Paris, Seuil, 2009, Collection "Bibliothèque".
 La Bible. Aux sources de la culture occidentale, Paris, Seuil, Point/Sagesse, 2013.

Prize 
 Prix Pierre-Georges-Castex 2007.

References

External links 
 Sellier, Philippe on Persée (web portal)
 Notice on the website of the Centre d'étude de la langue et de la littérature françaises des XVIIe et XVIIIe.

1931 births
Living people
Place of birth missing (living people)
French literary critics
French scholars